Michal Bojnanský (born 20 June 1995) is a Slovak professional footballer who plays for DAC Dunajská Streda.

Club statistics

Updated to games played as of 4 January 2014.

References

1995 births
Living people
Slovak footballers
Association football goalkeepers
FC DAC 1904 Dunajská Streda players
Slovak Super Liga players